Duck Creek Aqueduct, also known as the Metamora Aqueduct and Whitewater Canal Aqueduct, is a historic aqueduct carrying the Whitewater Canal over Duck Creek in Metamora Township, Franklin County, Indiana. Built in 1846, it is the only surviving covered wood aqueduct in the United States.  The aqueduct was listed on the National Register of Historic Places and designated a National Historic Landmark in 2014. It is located in the Whitewater Canal Historic District and part of the Metamora Historic District.

Description and history
The Duck Creek Aqueduct is located on the eastern fringe of the village of Metamora. The canal is paralleled by Metamora's Main Street as well as railroad tracks. Due to its wooden construction, the aqueduct closely resembles a traditional covered bridge. Water management valves and a spillway at the western end of the structure permit regulation of the water level of the canal. The roof is a 20th-century metal standing seam roof.

The original aqueduct was built between 1839 and 1843 as part of the canal's original construction. The present structure was built in 1846, after the original aqueduct was washed out in a flood. It was strengthened in 1868, and repaired in 1901. After abandonment and deterioration, the Duck Creek Aqueduct was restored to its present appearance in 1946–1949.  It has since undergone regular maintenance, including a historically sensitive replacement of the trough in 2005.

Covered bridge aqueducts were never particularly common in the United States.  In a nationwide survey conducted for the National Park Service in the 2010s, only ten structures were identified through historic records.  The Duck Creek Aqueduct is the only one of these still standing.

See also
List of bridges documented by the Historic American Engineering Record in Indiana
Metamora, Indiana

References

External links

Aqueducts in the United States
Historic American Engineering Record in Indiana
National Historic Landmarks in Indiana
Bridges completed in 1846
Transportation buildings and structures in Franklin County, Indiana
National Register of Historic Places in Franklin County, Indiana
Historic district contributing properties in Indiana
Aqueducts on the National Register of Historic Places
Transportation buildings and structures on the National Register of Historic Places in Indiana
Covered bridges on the National Register of Historic Places in Indiana
Wooden bridges in Indiana
Burr Truss bridges in the United States
Historic American Buildings Survey in Indiana